The 2015 AFL season will be the 119th season in the Australian Football League contested by the Sydney Swans.

Squad for 2015
Statistics are correct as of end of 2014 season.
Flags represent the state of origin, i.e. the state in which the player played his Under-18s football.

For players: (c) denotes captain, (vc) denotes vice-captain, (lg) denotes leadership group.
For coaches: (s) denotes senior coach, (cs) denotes caretaker senior coach, (a) denotes assistant coach, (d) denotes development coach.

Playing list changes

The following summarises all player changes between the conclusion of the 2014 season and the beginning of the 2015 season.

In

Out

List management

Season summary

Pre-season matches

Home and away season

Finals matches

Ladder

Team awards and records
Game records
In Round 1,  trailed  by 41 points during time on in the third quarter, before Sydney scored the last eight goals of the game to come from behind to record a twelve-point win. Sydney's three-quarter time deficit of 34 points was the largest it had ever overcome to win in the club's history.

Individual awards and records

Bob Skilton Medal

Rising Star Award: Isaac Heeney

Dennis Carroll Trophy for Most Improved Player: Tom Mitchell

Barry Round Shield for Best Clubman: Rhyce Shaw

Paul Kelly Players’ Player: Josh Kennedy

Paul Roos Award for Best Player in a Finals Series: Josh Kennedy

All-Australian Team
 Dan Hannebery (wing)
 Josh Kennedy (nominated)

AFL Players Association awards
Most Courageous Player: Luke Parker 
Best First Year Player: Isaac Heeney

Milestones
Round 2 - Ted Richards (200 club games), Dane Rampe (50 career games)
Round 5 - Jeremy Laidler (50 career games)
Round 7 - Jarrad McVeigh (250 career games), Gary Rohan (50 career games)
Round 9 - Ben McGlynn (150 career games), Lance Franklin (100 club goals)
Round 10 - Mike Pyke (100 career games)
Round 17 - Josh Kennedy (150 career games)
Round 19 - Luke Parker (100 career games)
Round 21 - Kurt Tippett (100 club goals)
Round 22 - Ted Richards (250 career games)
Round 23 - Kurt Tippett (150 career games), Harry Cunningham (50 career games)
Semi Final - Kurt Tippett (300 career goals)

Debuts
Round 1 - Isaac Heeney (AFL debut)
Round 9 - Daniel Robinson (AFL debut)
Round 14 - Toby Nankervis (AFL debut)
Round 21 - James Rose (AFL debut)

AFL Rising Star
The following Sydney players were nominated for the 2015 NAB AFL Rising Star award:
Round 3 – Isaac Heeney (nominated)
Isaac Heeney finished 4th in final voting.

22under22 Team
The following Sydney players were selected in the 22under22 Team:
 Luke Parker (vice-captain, half-forward flank)

Reserves

Regular season

Finals series

Ladder

Awards

NEAFL Team of the Year
Harry Marsh (back pocket) 
George Hewett (interchange)

References

Sydney Swans seasons
Sydney